Poi or POI may refer to:

Art and culture
 Poi (film), a 2006 Tamil-language film
 Poi (dessert), a traditional banana dessert from Samoa
 Poi (food), the traditional staple food in native cuisine of Hawaii
 Poi (performance art), a style of performing art
 Sierra Popoluca language, ISO 639-3 language code poi
 Poi (video game), a 2017 independent video game

Places
 Poi, Pakistan
 Poi, Ukhrul, India
 Poi, Wallis and Futuna
 Poi, a Tibetan pinyin representation of Tibet

Politics
 Independent Workers' Party (Parti ouvrier indépendant, POI), a French far-left political party
 Internationalist Workers Party (Parti ouvrier internationaliste, POI), a French Trotskyist political party

Other uses
 Apache POI, a project run by the Apache Software Foundation
 Hawaiian Poi Dog, an extinct breed of dog
 Person of interest (disambiguation)
 Point of interaction (POI), a component in point of sale equipment
 Points of interconnect (POI), in the Australian National Broadband Network
 Point of interest, a specific point location that someone may find useful or interesting
 Point of interface (POI), in telecommunications 
 Primary ovarian insufficiency (POI), partial or total of function of the ovaries

See also

Postorgasmic illness syndrome (POIS)